This is a list of newspapers in the Northern Mariana Islands.

Marianas Business Journal – Saipan
Marianas Variety News & Views – Saipan
Saipan Tribune – Saipan

Other regional newspapers:
Pacific Daily News – Guam
Palau Horizon – Palau

External links
ABYZ News Links: Northern Mariana Islands Newspapers and News Media Guide

Newspapers published in the Northern Mariana Islands
Newspapers
Newspapers
Northern Mariana Islands
Northern Mariana Islands
Northern Mariana Islands
Newspapers